The 2022 Sun Belt Conference women's basketball tournament will be the postseason women's basketball tournament for Sun Belt Conference during the 2021–22 NCAA Division I women's basketball season. All tournament games will be played at Pensacola Bay Center between March 2–7.  The winner will receive the Sun Belt's automatic bid to the 2022 NCAA tournament.

Seeds 
All 12 conference teams qualified for the tournament. The top four teams will received a bye into the quarterfinals.

Schedule

Bracket

References 

2021–22 Sun Belt Conference women's basketball season
Sun Belt Conference women's basketball tournament
Basketball competitions in Florida
College sports in Florida
Sports in Pensacola, Florida
Sun Belt Conference men's basketball tournament
Sun Belt Conference men's basketball tournament